Qantir is a village in Egypt. Qantir 
is believed to mark what was probably the ancient site of the 19th Dynasty Pharaoh Ramesses II's capital, Pi-Ramesses or Per-Ramesses ("House or Domain of Ramesses").

The Arabic name of the village contains  .

This was the older city in this area. Later on, Avaris was absorbed by Pi-Ramesses.

See also
List of ancient Egyptian sites, including sites of temples

References 

Populated places in Sharqia Governorate
Villages in Egypt
Pi-Ramesses